Favolaschia is a genus of fungi in the family Mycenaceae. The genus has a widespread distribution, and contains about 50 species. Like the genus Favolus, the name is derived from the Latin favus meaning honeycomb, as the fungi with the large pores on the underside are resembling a honeycomb. The name was first published as a section of the obsolete genus Laschia, which was named after Wilhelm Gottfried Lasch (1787-1863), who was a German apothecary and botanist.

Species

Favolaschia alsophilae
Favolaschia amoene-rosea
Favolaschia andina
Favolaschia aulaxina
Favolaschia aurantiaca
Favolaschia auriscalpium
Favolaschia austrocyatheae
Favolaschia calamicola
Favolaschia calocera
Favolaschia citrina
Favolaschia cyatheae
Favolaschia dumontii
Favolaschia dybowskyana
Favolaschia echinata
Favolaschia fendleri
Favolaschia fujisanensis
Favolaschia furfurella
Favolaschia gaillardii
Favolaschia gelatina — Japan
Favolaschia heliconiae
Favolaschia holtermannii
Favolaschia intermedia
Favolaschia lateritia
Favolaschia mainsii
Favolaschia manipularis
Favolaschia meridae
Favolaschia moelleri
Favolaschia montana
Favolaschia nigrostriata
Favolaschia nipponica
Favolaschia oligogloea
Favolaschia oligopora
Favolaschia pantherina
Favolaschia papuana
Favolaschia pegleri
Favolaschia peziziformis
Favolaschia pezizoidea
Favolaschia phyllostachydis
Favolaschia pterigena
Favolaschia puberula
Favolaschia puiggarii
Favolaschia pustulosa
Favolaschia pygmaea
Favolaschia roseogrisea
Favolaschia rubra
Favolaschia sabalensis
Favolaschia selloana
Favolaschia singeriana
Favolaschia sprucei
Favolaschia subamyloidea
Favolaschia subceracea
Favolaschia teapae
Favolaschia thwaitesii
Favolaschia varariotecta
Favolaschia violascens
Favolaschia volkensii
Favolaschia zenkeriana

See also
List of Agaricales genera

References

External links

Mycenaceae
Agaricales genera
Taxa named by Narcisse Théophile Patouillard